T: The New York Times Style Magazine is a perfect-bound magazine publication of The New York Times newspaper dedicated to fashion, living, beauty, holiday, travel, and design coverage. It was launched in August 2004. It was published 13 times per year between 2013 and 2016, and since January 2017 has been published 11 times per year. It is distributed with the Sunday edition of the newspaper. Janet Froelich was creative director until 2009. T is not a supplement of The New York Times Magazine, but a distinct publication with its own staff.

Since December 2007, an international edition has been distributed with the weekend edition of The New York Times International Edition (or International New York Times, formerly the International Herald Tribune). In 2010, its first country-specific edition, T Qatar was launched by Ravi Raman. It was followed by T China, T Japan, T Singapore and T Spain the first licensed edition in the European market.

Editorship
Stefano Tonchi was editor until 2010; his replacement was Sally Singer. Singer left in 2012 and was replaced by Deborah Needleman. In 2013, Brendan Monaghan was announced as the first publisher, whilst Monaghan and Sebastian Tomich were jointly named vice presidents of advertising. Monaghan departed T in 2015 and in March 2016, former Women's Health Associate Publisher, Elizabeth Webbe Lunny joined the magazine as Vice President and Publisher.

Deborah Needleman left T in late November 2016, after four years in the position. Executive editor Whitney Vargas was filling in for Needleman in the interim, but Vargas left the magazine in February. T's previous articles editor Nick Haramis recently took the job of editor-in-chief of Interview magazine. Under Needleman's leadership, T underwent a redesign and increased its ad pages. The luxury magazine had its ad pages grow by 30 percent in the first three quarters of 2016, compared to the same period in 2012, to 934 pages, according to Business of Fashion. Since the editorial departures, T’s advertising business under Lunny has largely been down with steep declines in paging in key 2017 Women's & Men's Spring Fashion issues.

In 2017, Hanya Yanagihara took the helm as the editor-in-chief of T.

Awards

The American Society of Magazine Editors' National Magazine Awards, sometimes known as "Ellies," were given to the New York Times Style Magazine and the New York Times Magazine in 2019. Both publications are owned by the same company. In 2021, the New York Times Style Magazine won the National Magazine Award for General Excellence, Service, and Lifestyle, one of the most prestigious honors given by the American Society of Magazine Editors each year. Mamadi Doumbouya, a photographer who works with the Magazine, was named a recipient of an ASME Next award. T also had a finalist in the video category for "Long Island’s Enduring Black Beachfront Community," directed by Joshua Kissi.

References

External links
 

Lifestyle magazines published in the United States
Magazines established in 2004
Magazines published in New York City
The New York Times
Newspaper supplements
Sunday magazines